Ophiarachnella is a genus of echinoderms belonging to the family Ophiodermatidae.

The species of this genus are found in Southern Hemisphere.

Species:

Ophiarachnella africana 
Ophiarachnella capensis 
Ophiarachnella differens 
Ophiarachnella elegans 
Ophiarachnella gorgonia 
Ophiarachnella honorata 
Ophiarachnella infernalis 
Ophiarachnella macracantha 
Ophiarachnella megalaspis 
Ophiarachnella parvispina 
Ophiarachnella paucigranula 
Ophiarachnella paucispina 
Ophiarachnella petersi 
Ophiarachnella planispina 
Ophiarachnella ramsayi 
Ophiarachnella semicincta 
Ophiarachnella septemspinosa 
Ophiarachnella similis 
Ophiarachnella snelliusi 
Ophiarachnella sphenisci 
Ophiarachnella stabilis 
Ophiarachnella stearnsii

References

Ophiuroidea genera
Ophiurida